Andrea Brachfeld is an American jazz and Latin jazz flutist.

Brachfeld attended The High School of Music and Art and the Manhattan School of Music. She had her first professional performance at the age of 16. In 1974, she received the Louis Armstrong Award for outstanding Jazz student. She studied with Hubert Laws, Jimmy Heath, George Coleman, and Eddie Daniels.

Her breakthrough came when she became flutist for the Latin band Charanga '76.

Discography
 Remembered Dreams (Spirit Nectar, 2001)
 Back With Sweet Passion (Latin Cool, 2003)
 Beyond Standards with Chembo Corniel (Consolidated Artists, 2006)
 Into the World: A Musical Offering (Shaneye, 2008)
 Songs from the Divine (Shaneye, 2009)
 Lady of the Island (Zoho, 2012)
 Lotus Blossom (Jazzheads, 2015)
 If Not Now, When? (Jazzheads, 2018)
 Brazilian Whispers (Origin, 2020?)
 As Andrea Brachfeld & Insight: Evolution (Origin, 2022)

References

Year of birth missing (living people)
Living people
American jazz flautists
Women flautists
Latin jazz flautists